Gordon Wood may refer to:

 Gordon S. Wood (born 1933), American historian
 Gordon Wood (American football) (1914–2003), high school football coach in Texas
 Gordon Eric Wood, Australian jailed then acquitted of the murder of Caroline Byrne
 Gordon Wood (rugby union) (1931–1982), rugby union footballer

See also
 Gordon Woods (1952–2009), veterinary scientist